Feđa Isović (born 25 February 1965) is a Bosnian screenwriter.

His most popular work is the Bosnian sitcom Lud, zbunjen, normalan. Isović also wrote the screenplay for the 2012 film Halima's Path.

Since 2010, he has been a part of Bosnian pop-rock band Karne, a group he formed alongside Miraj Grbić and Goran Navojec. With Karne, he released one album called Diktatura amatera in 2012.

Filmography

As actor

Television

As director and writer

Film

Television

Discography

with Karne
Diktatura amatera - 2012

References

External links

1965 births
Living people
Film people from Sarajevo
Bosniaks of Bosnia and Herzegovina
Musicians from Sarajevo